Fred Cowan is a Kentucky politician. He currently serves as a Kentucky Circuit Judge of the 30th judicial district in Louisville. He is a former Kentucky Attorney General (1988–1992) and former member of the Kentucky State House of Representatives for the 32nd district (1982–1987).  Cowan is one of the few Kentuckians who has been elected to all three branches of Kentuckian State Government.

Cowan was born on October 11, 1945 in New York, NY to Mary Virginia Wesley of Union County, KY, and Frederic Sr. of NY, NY. At age 8 he moved to Sturgis, Kentucky and a year later moved to Louisville where he attended Bloom Elementary, Highland Middle, and Atherton High School.  In 1967 Cowan graduated from Dartmouth College and served in the Peace Corps in Dessie, Ethiopia (1967–1969).  While in Ethiopia, he taught English at Woizero Siheen High School and became fluent in Amharic.

Once he returned to the US, he taught 5th grade in North Carolina before moving to Little Rock, Arkansas where he was a copy editor at the Arkansas Democrat and then started a grassroots consumer organization.  In Little Rock, he met and married Linda Marshall Scholle, granddaughter of Lenore Marshall and great-granddaughter of Louis Marshall.  Fred and Linda moved to Massachusetts for Fred to attend Harvard Law School where he graduated in 1978.

Cowan moved to Louisville and worked for the campaign of Harvey Sloane for Governor of Kentucky in 1978–1979.  After the unsuccessful campaign, Cowan practiced law with former Brown, Todd and Heyburn (Frost Brown Todd) and ran for State Representative, defeating a ten-term Republican incumbent.  In 1987 he ran for Attorney General of Kentucky and defeated Todd Hollenbach in the Democratic primary.  As Attorney General he successfully argued Stanford v. Kentucky before the United States Supreme Court in 1989. In 2005, the case was reversed by Roper v. Simmons.

Before being elected Judge in 2006, he practiced law from 1992 to 2006 with Lynch, Cox, Gillman and Mayhan (now Lynch, Cox, Gillman and Goodman).

Cowan is the younger brother of author Roberta Bondi, older brother of History Detective Wesley Cowan and first cousin of actress and singer Kassie Wesley DePaiva.  He and Linda have three daughters.

References

Living people
Kentucky state court judges
1945 births
Politicians from Louisville, Kentucky
Atherton High School alumni
Dartmouth College alumni
Democratic Party members of the Kentucky House of Representatives
Kentucky Attorneys General
Harvard Law School alumni